Insane Woman is an 1822 oil on canvas painting by Théodore Géricault in a series of work Géricault did on the mentally ill. It is housed in the Musée des Beaux-Arts de Lyon, France.

Mental aberration and irrational states of mind interested artists against Enlightenment rationality. Géricault, like many of his contemporaries, examined the influence of mental states on the human face and shared the belief, common in his time, that a face more accurately revealed character, especially in madness and at the moment of death. He made many studies of the inmates in hospitals and institutions for the criminally insane, and he studied the heads of guillotine victims.

Géricault's Insane Woman, her mouth tense, her eyes red-rimmed with suffering, is one of several portraits he made of the mentally ill. These portraits present the physical facts with authenticity, especially in contrast to earlier idealized commissioned portraiture.

References

External links

Paintings by Théodore Géricault
1822 paintings
Paintings in the collection of the Museum of Fine Arts of Lyon